The Roscommon Senior Football Championship is an annual Gaelic Athletic Association competition between the top Gaelic football clubs in County Roscommon. The winners of the Roscommon Championship receive the Fahey Cup and qualify to represent their county in the Connacht Senior Club Football Championship. 

The 2021 Championship was won by Padraig Pearses who defeated Clann na nGael by a score of 2-08 to 0-11. Roscommon representatives have gone on to win the Connacht title on thirteen occasions. In 2013, St Brigid's became the first Roscommon club to win the All-Ireland Senior Club Football Championship.

Roll of honour

List of finals

References

External links
 Official Roscommon Website
 Roscommon on Hoganstand
 Roscommon Club GAA

 
Roscommon GAA club championships
Senior Gaelic football county championships